Cristina-Lucreția Pîrv (born ) is a Romanian female volleyball player, who played as a wing spiker. She was part of the Romania women's national volleyball team at the 1994 FIVB Volleyball Women's World Championship in Brazil., 2002 FIVB Volleyball Women's World Championship in Germany, and 2001 Women's European Volleyball Championship.

Playing career

Honours

Club
Dinamo Bucharest
Romanian Championship: 1989

Minas Clube
Brazilian Superliga: 2002

AGIL Novara
CEV Cup: 2003

RC Cannes
French Championship: 2005
French Cup: 2005

Asystel Novara
Italian Cup: 2004
Italian Supercup: 2005
Top Teams Cup / CEV Cup: 2006

Personal life
Since 2003 she has been married to the Brazilian former international volleyball player, Giba. They have 2 children together, a daughter Nicoll (born 2004)  and a son Patrick (born 2008). In November 2012, Cristina has filed for divorce.

References

External links 

 

1972 births
Living people
Romanian women's volleyball players
Romanian expatriate sportspeople in Italy
Romanian expatriate sportspeople in France
Universiade medalists in volleyball
Universiade gold medalists for Romania
People from Turda
Medalists at the 1993 Summer Universiade